The 1998 Derby City Council election took place on 7 May 1998 to elect members of Derby City Council in England. One third of the council was up for election and the Labour party kept overall control of the council.

One of the two Labour councillors defeated in the election was Milton Crosdale, the father of Imaani, who was taking part in the Eurovision Song Contest for the United Kingdom two days after the election. Crosdale had been defending a three-vote majority in Blagreaves ward.

After the election, the composition of the council was
Labour 37
Conservative 4
Liberal Democrat 3

Election result

Ward results

Abbey

Allestree

Alvaston

Babington

Blagreaves

Boulton

Breadsall

Chaddesden

Chellaston

Darley

Derwent

Kingsway

Litchurch

Spondon

References

1998 English local elections
1998
1990s in Derby